Kong Asgers Høj is a large passage grave on the island of Møn in Denmark. 

The megalithic structure dated to Neolithic Funnel Beaker culture. The grave consists of a chamber (10 m long by 2 m wide) with a long passage (7.5 m long). This type of graves is found primarily in Denmark, Germany and Scandinavia, and occasionally in France and the Netherlands.

Study of King Asger Høj began in 1839, when the Danish merchant Gustav Hage tried to find a treasure, found it empty. The grave is structurally untouched since ancient times, but may have been cleared then. It was used as Secondary burial for Corded Ware culture period.

External links 
 https://web.archive.org/web/20110718062329/http://www.insula-moenia.dk/kong_asgers_hoj.html
 http://gg.campacasa.eu/Archaeology/Tours/Denmark_Sverige_2004/Denmark_Sverige_2004.htm#Kong%20Asgers%20Hoj
 Location map at www.visitvordingborg.dk

Megalithic monuments in Denmark
Møn
Archaeology of Region Zealand
Funnelbeaker culture
Corded Ware culture